The Canton of Longueville-sur-Scie is a former canton situated in the Seine-Maritime département and in the Haute-Normandie region of northern France. It was disbanded following the French canton reorganisation which came into effect in March 2015. It consisted of 23 communes, which joined the canton of Luneray in 2015. It had a total of 8,022 inhabitants (2012).

Geography 
An area of farming and associated light industry in the arrondissement of Dieppe, centred on the town of Longueville-sur-Scie. The altitude varies from 14m (Saint-Germain-d'Étables) to 176m (Muchedent) for an average altitude of 87m.

The canton comprised 23 communes:

Anneville-sur-Scie
Belmesnil
Bertreville-Saint-Ouen
Le Bois-Robert
Le Catelier
Les Cent-Acres
La Chapelle-du-Bourgay
La Chaussée
Criquetot-sur-Longueville
Crosville-sur-Scie
Dénestanville
Heugleville-sur-Scie
Lintot-les-Bois
Longueville-sur-Scie
Manéhouville
Muchedent
Notre-Dame-du-Parc
Saint-Crespin
Saint-Germain-d'Étables
Saint-Honoré
Sainte-Foy
Torcy-le-Grand
Torcy-le-Petit

Population

See also 
 Arrondissements of the Seine-Maritime department
 Cantons of the Seine-Maritime department
 Communes of the Seine-Maritime department

References

Longueville-sur-Scie
2015 disestablishments in France
States and territories disestablished in 2015